In probability theory and statistics, the cumulants  of a probability distribution are a set of quantities that provide an alternative to the moments of the distribution.  Any two probability distributions whose moments are identical will have identical cumulants as well, and vice versa.
 
The first cumulant is the mean, the second cumulant is the variance, and the third cumulant is the same as the third central moment. But fourth and higher-order cumulants are not equal to central moments. In some cases theoretical treatments of problems in terms of cumulants are simpler than those using moments. In particular, when two or more random variables are statistically independent, the -th-order cumulant of their sum is equal to the sum of their -th-order cumulants. As well, the third and higher-order cumulants of a normal distribution are zero, and it is the only distribution with this property.

Just as for moments, where joint moments are used for collections of random variables, it is possible to define joint cumulants.

Definition
The cumulants of a random variable  are defined using the cumulant-generating function , which is the natural logarithm of the moment-generating function:

The cumulants  are obtained from a power series expansion of the cumulant generating function:

This expansion is a Maclaurin series, so the -th cumulant can be obtained by differentiating the above expansion  times and evaluating the result at zero:

If the moment-generating function does not exist, the cumulants can be defined in terms of the relationship between cumulants and moments discussed later.

Alternative definition of the cumulant generating function
Some writers prefer to define the cumulant-generating function as the natural logarithm of the characteristic function, which is sometimes also called the second characteristic function,

Although the function  will be well defined, it will nonetheless mimic  in terms of the length of its Maclaurin series, which may not extend beyond (or, rarely, even to) linear order in the argument , and in particular the number of cumulants that are well defined will not change. Nevertheless, even when  does not have a long Maclaurin series, it can be used directly in analyzing and, particularly, adding random variables. Both the Cauchy distribution (also called the Lorentzian) and more generally, stable distributions (related to the Lévy distribution) are examples of distributions for which the power-series expansions of the generating functions have only finitely many well-defined terms.

Some basic properties

The -th cumulant  of (the distribution of) a random variable  enjoys the following properties:

(If  then we have 
 If  is constant (i.e. not random) then  i.e. the -th cumulant is homogeneous of degree .
 If random variables  are independent then
 
 i.e. the cumulant is cumulative– hence the name.

The cumulative property follows quickly by considering the cumulant-generating function:

so that each cumulant of a sum of independent random variables is the sum of the corresponding cumulants of the addends.  That is, when the addends are statistically independent, the mean of the sum is the sum of the means, the variance of the sum is the sum of the variances, the third cumulant (which happens to be the third central moment) of the sum is the sum of the third cumulants, and so on for each order of cumulant.

A distribution with given cumulants  can be approximated through an Edgeworth series.

The first several cumulants as functions of the moments 

All of the higher cumulants are polynomial functions of the central moments, with integer coefficients, but only in degrees 2 and 3 are the cumulants actually central moments.

 mean
 the variance, or second central moment.
 the third central moment.
 the fourth central moment minus three times the square of the second central moment. Thus this is the first case in which cumulants are not simply moments or central moments. The central moments of degree more than 3 lack the cumulative property.

Cumulants of some discrete probability distributions
 The constant random variables .
 The Bernoulli distributions, (number of successes in one trial with probability  of success). The cumulants satisfy a recursion formula

 

 The geometric distributions, (number of failures before one success with probability  of success on each trial).
 The Poisson distributions. All cumulants are equal to the parameter: .
 The binomial distributions, (number of successes in  independent trials with probability  of success on each trial). The special case  is a Bernoulli distribution. Every cumulant is just  times the corresponding cumulant of the corresponding Bernoulli distribution. The limiting case  is a Poisson distribution.
 The negative binomial distributions, (number of failures before  successes with probability  of success on each trial). The special case  is a geometric distribution. Every cumulant is just  times the corresponding cumulant of the corresponding geometric distribution. Comparing these formulas to those of the binomial distributions explains the name 'negative binomial distribution'. The limiting case   is a Poisson distribution.

Introducing the variance-to-mean ratio

 

the above probability distributions get a unified formula for the derivative of the cumulant generating function:

 

The second derivative is

 

The constant random variables  have .

The binomial distributions have  so that .

The Poisson distributions have .

The negative binomial distributions have  so that .

Note the analogy to the classification of conic sections by eccentricity: circles , ellipses , parabolas , hyperbolas .

Cumulants of some continuous probability distributions
The special case  is a constant random variable .

Some properties of the cumulant generating function
The cumulant generating function , if it exists, is infinitely differentiable and convex, and passes through the origin.  Its first derivative ranges monotonically in the open interval from the infimum to the supremum of the support of the probability distribution, and its second derivative is strictly positive everywhere it is defined, except for the degenerate distribution of a single point mass.  The cumulant-generating function exists if and only if the tails of the distribution are majorized by an exponential decay, that is, (see Big O notation)

where  is the cumulative distribution function.  The cumulant-generating function will have vertical asymptote(s) at the negative supremum of such , if such a supremum exists, and at the supremum of such , if such a supremum exists, otherwise it will be defined for all real numbers.

If the support of a random variable  has finite upper or lower bounds, then its cumulant-generating function , if it exists, approaches asymptote(s) whose slope is equal to the supremum and/or infimum of the support,
 
respectively, lying above both these lines everywhere. (The integrals

yield the -intercepts of these asymptotes, since .)

Further properties of cumulants

A negative result
Given the results for the cumulants of the normal distribution, it might be hoped to find families of distributions for which
There are no such distributions. The underlying result here is that the cumulant generating function cannot be a finite-order polynomial of degree greater than 2.

Cumulants and moments
The moment generating function is given by:
 

So the cumulant generating function is the logarithm of the moment generating function

The first cumulant is the expected value; the second and third cumulants are respectively the second and third central moments (the second central moment is the variance); but the higher cumulants are neither moments nor central moments, but rather more complicated polynomial functions of the moments.

 

The explicit expression for the -th moment in terms of the first  cumulants, and vice versa, can be obtained by using Faà di Bruno's formula for higher derivatives of composite functions. In general, we have

 
 

where  are incomplete (or partial) Bell polynomials.

 

and the -th central moment is obtained in terms of cumulants as

 

 
 
The -th moment  is an -th-degree polynomial in the first  cumulants. The first few expressions are:

 

The "prime" distinguishes the moments  from the central moments .  To express the central moments as functions of the cumulants, just drop from these polynomials all terms in which  appears as a factor:

 

Similarly, the -th cumulant  is an -th-degree polynomial in the first  non-central moments. The first few expressions are:

 

 

Cumulants and set-partitions
These polynomials have a remarkable combinatorial interpretation: the coefficients count certain partitions of sets.  A general form of these polynomials is

where

 runs through the list of all partitions of a set of size ;
"" means  is one of the "blocks" into which the set is partitioned; and
 is the size of the set .

A partition of the integer   corresponds to each term. The coefficient in each term is the number of partitions of a set of  members that collapse to that partition of the integer  when the members of the set become indistinguishable.

Cumulants and combinatorics
Further connection between cumulants and combinatorics can be found in the work of Gian-Carlo Rota, where links to invariant theory, symmetric functions, and binomial sequences are studied via umbral calculus.

Joint cumulants
The joint cumulant of several random variables  is defined by a similar cumulant generating function

A consequence is that

For example,

is the covariance, and

If any of these random variables are identical, e.g. if , then the same formulae apply, e.g.

although for such repeated variables there are more concise formulae.  For zero-mean random vectors,

The joint cumulant of just one random variable is its expected value, and that of two random variables is their covariance.  If some of the random variables are independent of all of the others, then any cumulant involving two (or more) independent random variables is zero.  If all  random variables are the same, then the joint cumulant is the -th ordinary cumulant.

The combinatorial meaning of the expression of moments in terms of cumulants is easier to understand than that of cumulants in terms of moments:

 

For example:

 

Another important property of joint cumulants is multilinearity:

Just as the second cumulant is the variance, the joint cumulant of just two random variables is the covariance.  The familiar identity

 

generalizes to cumulants:

Conditional cumulants and the law of total cumulance

The law of total expectation and the law of total variance generalize naturally to conditional cumulants.  The case , expressed in the language of (central) moments rather than that of cumulants, says

 

In general,

where

 the sum is over all partitions  of the set  of indices, and
 1, ..., b are all of the "blocks" of the partition ; the expression  indicates that the joint cumulant of the random variables whose indices are in that block of the partition.

Relation to statistical physics
In statistical physics many extensive quantities – that is quantities that are proportional to the volume or size of a given system – are related to cumulants of random variables.  The deep connection is that in a large system an extensive quantity like the energy or number of particles can be thought of as the sum of (say) the energy associated with a number of nearly independent regions.  The fact that the cumulants of these nearly independent random variables will (nearly) add make it reasonable that extensive quantities should be expected to be related to cumulants.

A system in equilibrium with a thermal bath at temperature   have a fluctuating internal energy , which can be considered a random variable drawn from a distribution .  The partition function of the system is

Hence the first and second cumulant for the energy  give the average energy and heat capacity.

The Helmholtz free energy expressed in terms of

further connects thermodynamic quantities with cumulant generating function for the energy. Thermodynamics properties that are derivatives of the free energy, such as its internal energy, entropy, and specific heat capacity, all can be readily expressed in terms of these cumulants. Other free energy can be a function of other variables such as the magnetic field or chemical potential , e.g.

 

History
The history of cumulants is discussed by Anders Hald.

Cumulants were first introduced by Thorvald N. Thiele, in 1889, who called them semi-invariants.  They were first called cumulants in a 1932 paper by Ronald Fisher and John Wishart. Fisher was publicly reminded of Thiele's work by Neyman, who also notes previous published citations of Thiele brought to Fisher's attention.   Stephen Stigler has said that the name cumulant was suggested to Fisher in a letter from Harold Hotelling.  In a paper published in 1929, Fisher had called them cumulative moment functions. The partition function in statistical physics was introduced by Josiah Willard Gibbs in 1901. The free energy is often called Gibbs free energy. In statistical mechanics, cumulants are also known as Ursell functions relating to a publication in 1927.

Cumulants in generalized settings

Formal cumulants
More generally, the cumulants of a sequence , not necessarily the moments of any probability distribution, are, by definition,

 

All of the difficulties of the "problem of cumulants" are absent when one works formally. The simplest example is that the second cumulant of a probability distribution must always be nonnegative, and is zero only if all of the higher cumulants are zero. Formal cumulants are subject to no such constraints.

Bell numbers
In combinatorics, the -th Bell number is the number of partitions of a set of size .  All of the cumulants of the sequence of Bell numbers are equal to 1.  The Bell numbers are the moments of the Poisson distribution with expected value 1.

Cumulants of a polynomial sequence of binomial type
For any sequence  of scalars in a field of characteristic zero, being considered formal cumulants, there is a corresponding sequence  of formal moments, given by the polynomials above. For those polynomials, construct a polynomial sequence in the following way.  Out of the polynomial

 

make a new polynomial in these plus one additional variable :

 

and then generalize the pattern. Each coefficient is a polynomial in the cumulants; these are the Bell polynomials, named after Eric Temple Bell.

This sequence of polynomials is of binomial type.  In fact, no other sequences of binomial type exist; every polynomial sequence of binomial type is completely determined by its sequence of formal cumulants.

Free cumulants
In the above moment-cumulant formula

for joint cumulants,
one sums over all partitions of the set . These free cumulants were introduced by Roland Speicher and play a central role in free probability theory. In that theory, rather than considering independence of random variables, defined in terms of tensor products of algebras of random variables, one considers instead free independence of random variables, defined in terms of free products of algebras.

The ordinary cumulants of degree higher than 2 of the normal distribution are zero.  The free cumulants of degree higher than 2 of the Wigner semicircle distribution are zero. This is one respect in which the role of the Wigner distribution in free probability theory is analogous to that of the normal distribution in conventional probability theory.

See also
 Entropic value at risk
 Cumulant generating function from a multiset
 Cornish–Fisher expansion
 Edgeworth expansion
 Polykay
 k-statistic, a minimum-variance unbiased estimator of a cumulant
 Ursell function
 Total position spread tensor as an application of cumulants to analyse the electronic wave function in quantum chemistry.

References

External links
 
cumulant on the Earliest known uses of some of the words of mathematics

Moment (mathematics)